Rod Boleche Hobe (Bengali: রোদ বলেছে হবে) is a solo album released by Shayan Chowdhury Arnob in 2010.

Track listing

References

2010 albums